Country First may refer to:
Slogan of John McCain 2008 presidential campaign
Country First Movement